James Kuzwa Dique Enoque is a Mozambican politician. In 2004 she was a member of the Pan-African Parliament  and in the Agricultural committee. She was elected to the Assembly of the Republic of Mozambique with RENAMO from Manica Province in the 1999 election.

References

Year of birth missing (living people)
Living people
Members of the Assembly of the Republic (Mozambique)
Members of the Pan-African Parliament from Mozambique
People from Manica Province
RENAMO politicians
20th-century Mozambican women politicians
20th-century Mozambican politicians
21st-century Mozambican women politicians
21st-century Mozambican politicians
Women members of the Pan-African Parliament